Robert Cortes Holliday (July 18, 1880 – January 1, 1947) was an American writer and literary editor.

Biography
He was born on July 18, 1880, in Indianapolis, Indiana, and moved to New York to study at the Art Students' League and worked briefly as an illustrator for periodicals.

He then sold books, worked as a librarian, and became a literary editor at the New York Tribune, Doubleday, Page & Co., and George H. Doran & Co. before taking an editorial position with The Bookman, serving as its chief editor from 1919 to 1920. After he left The Bookman in 1923, Holliday continued his criticism, worked for brief stints in advertising, and in 1926 became an instructor on writing for publication. Holliday also published fifteen books, including The Walking-Stick Papers (1918), Men and Books and Cities (1920), Literary Lanes and Other Byways (1925), as well as volumes on Booth Tarkington and poet Joyce Kilmer (for whom he served as literary executor).

He died on January 1, 1947, in Manhattan, New York City of heart disease.

Legacy
Writer and friend, Christopher Morley, wrote of Holliday: "[he] has the genuine gift of the personal essay, mellow, fluent, and pleasantly eccentric."

Sometime between 1920 and 1925, Robert Holliday signed The Greenwich Village Bookshop Door, an autograph book of 242 bohemians. The door is now held by the Harry Ransom Center at the University of Texas at Austin, and his signature can be found on front panel 2.

Bibliography
Walking-Stick Papers (1918)
Booth Tarkington (1918)
Peeps at People (1919)
Broome Street Straws (1919)
Men and Books and Cities (1920) 
Turns about Town (1921)
Literary Lanes and Other Byways (1925)

References

External links
 
 
 

1880 births
1947 deaths
Writers from Indiana
American male essayists
American male short story writers
20th-century American short story writers
20th-century American essayists
20th-century American male writers